DXRL (101.5 FM) is a radio station owned by Nation Broadcasting Corporation and operated by TV5 Network, Inc., serving as a relay station of Radyo5 in Manila. The station's transmitter is located along Ramon Chavez St., Cagayan de Oro.

History
The station began operations in 1976 as MRS 101.5, airing an adult contemporary format. In 1998, after NBC was acquired by PLDT subsidiary MediaQuest Holdings, the station rebranded as Sandy @ Rhythms 101.5 (later on shortened to Sandy 101.5) and switched to a Top 40 format. In 2007, it rebranded as 101.5 Fusion FM. In 2011, months after TV5 took over operations of the stations, it became a relay station of Radyo5 92.3 in Manila.

References

Radio stations in Cagayan de Oro
Radio stations established in 1976
News and talk radio stations in the Philippines